The men's high jump event at the 1991 Summer Universiade was held at the Don Valley Stadium in Sheffield on 24 and 25 July 1991.

Medalists

Results

Qualification

Final

References

Athletics at the 1991 Summer Universiade
1991